Bardwell is a city in Ellis County, in the U.S. state of Texas. The population was 649 at the 2010 census.

Geography

Highway 34 leads northeast  to Ennis and southwest  to Italy.

History
The community was settled in the early 1880s when the town's namesake, John W. Bardwell, built a cotton gin one mile south of the present-day location. A school opened in 1892 and a post office was established in 1893. When the Trinity and Brazos Valley Railway was routed through Ellis County in 1907, the gin and community were moved to the nearest stretch of track. The town had its own telephone system and electricity supplied by lines from Ennis in 1914. Bardwell prospered throughout the 1920s as a cotton shipping point with three gins and six grocery stores. The population grew to 650 by 1929, but the Great Depression and a subsequent drought severely impacted the community. The main road was rerouted to the new State Highway 34 in the early 1940s and most of Bardwell's businesses either closed or moved to sites along the highway. In 1958, Bardwell's school consolidated with nearby Ennis. After dropping to a low of 277 during the 1970s, the population began to grow. By 1990, 387 people lived in Bardwell. That figure had grown to 583 by 2000.

Demographics

As of the census of 2000,  583 people, 167 households, and 139 families resided in the city. The population density was 2,093.7 people per square mile (803.9/km2). The 176 housing units averaged 632.1 per square mile (242.7/km2). The racial makeup of the city was 61.58% White, 17.50% African American, 1.37% Native American, 18.52% from other races, and 1.03% from two or more races. Hispanics or Latinos of any race were 47.51% of the population.

Of the 167 households, 47.9% had children under the age of 18 living with them, 62.3% were married couples living together, 15.0% had a female householder with no husband present, and 16.2% were not families. About 13.8% of all households were made up of individuals, and 5.4% had someone living alone who was 65 years of age or older. The average household size was 3.49 and the average family size was 3.86.

In the city, the population was distributed as 37.7% under the age of 18, 8.6% from 18 to 24, 27.8% from 25 to 44, 17.7% from 45 to 64, and 8.2% who were 65 years of age or older. The median age was 28 years. For every 100 females, there were 98.3 males. For every 100 females age 18 and over, there were 93.1 males.

Males had a median income of $28,125 versus $16,250 for females. The per capita income for the city was $10,666. About 26.5% of families and 24.7% of the population were below the poverty line, including 26.8% of those under age 18 and 35.4% of those age 65 or over.

Education
Bardwell is served by the Ennis Independent School District. The school district had an enrollment of 5,838 for the 2011–2012 school year.

Gallery

References

External links

Ennis Independent School District

Dallas–Fort Worth metroplex
Cities in Texas
Cities in Ellis County, Texas
Populated places established in 1892